George Damer, 2nd Earl of Dorchester, PC, PC (Ire) (28 March 1746 – 7 March 1808), styled Viscount Milton between 1792 and 1798, was a British politician. He served as Chief Secretary for Ireland between 1794 and 1795.

Background
Dorchester was the second son of Joseph Damer, 1st Earl of Dorchester. He was educated at Eton and Trinity College, Cambridge, where he took his MA in 1767.

Political career
Lord Dorchester sat as Member of Parliament for Cricklade between 1768 and 1774, for Anstruther Burghs between 1778 and 1780, for Dorchester between 1780 and 1790 and for Malton between 1792 and 1798. He also represented Naas in the Irish House of Commons between 1795 and 1798 and served under William Pitt the Younger as Chief Secretary for Ireland between 1794 and 1795. He was sworn of the British Privy Council in 1794 and of the Irish Privy Council in 1795.

He succeeded his father in the earldom on 12 January 1798, his elder brother having committed suicide in 1776, and entered the House of Lords. On 25 June 1798, he was appointed colonel of the Dorset Militia in succession to Lord Rivers, but resigned in late 1799. Lord Dorchester was also Lord Lieutenant of Dorset, and colonel of the Dorsetshire Yeomanry Cavalry, from 1803 to 1808.

Personal life

Lord Dorchester was a great favourite of the Royal family who always stayed with him at his estate at Milton Abbey near Weymouth. He died unmarried in Park Lane, London, in March 1808, aged 61, when his titles became extinct. His estates were inherited by his sister Lady Caroline Damer, and on her death in 1828 by their Dawson cousins, who assumed the additional name of Damer. John Dawson-Damer, 2nd Earl of Portarlington, inherited the large but encumbered Irish properties, and his younger brothers Henry and George Dawson-Damer received respectively the estates of Milton Abbey and Came.

References

1746 births
1808 deaths
People educated at Eton College
Alumni of Trinity College, Cambridge
British Militia officers
Damer, George
Damer, George
Damer, George
Damer, George
Milton, George Damer, Viscount
Milton, George Damer, Viscount
Earls in the Peerage of Great Britain
Milton, George Damer, Viscount
Lord-Lieutenants of Dorset
Milton, George Damer, Viscount
Damer, George
Members of the Privy Council of Ireland
Members of the Privy Council of the United Kingdom
Queen's Own Dorset Yeomanry officers
Whig (British political party) MPs
Place of birth unknown
Chief Secretaries for Ireland
Members of the Parliament of Ireland (pre-1801) for County Kildare constituencies
Members of the Parliament of Great Britain for Cricklade
Dawson-Damer family